Jelle's Marble Runs is a YouTube channel based in the Netherlands centered on marbles, marble runs and marble races. It is run by the brothers Jelle and Dion Bakker. The channel spoofs the Olympic Games, Formula One, and other sporting events with marbles and treats the cast of marbles as though they were athletes. Fans participate in this elaborate kayfabe by acting as though the inanimate marbles use actual tactics, training, and psychology to compete.

The Marble League (formerly MarbleLympics and previously Marble Olympics) has a choreographed Opening and Closing Ceremony, often created using stop motion. Many of the sports are designed to resemble Olympic sports. Each year, the channel uploads a new series of the Marble League featuring different events and teams, which are introduced in the Qualifying round. As of 9 December 2022, the current channel has over 1.37 million subscribers with more than 153 million views.

Overview
Jelle's Marble Runs has built a following personifying marbles throughout a variety of competitions. Each video is produced in the form of a sporting event with commentary provided by Greg Woods. The channel features annual series such as the Marble League, the Marble Rally, Marbula One, and the Hubelino Tournament. Additionally, Jelle produces seasonal Halloween and Christmas content, as well as one-off events such as the A-Maze-ing Marble Race. Interspersed between the competition videos, Jelle releases a wide variety of marble runs without commentary exhibiting his marble course constructions (some of which are on display in museums).

History
Jelle Bakker was born in 1983 in Wervershoof, Netherlands. He has stated that he has a form of autism, and said that because he has no occupation, making marble machines was one of his biggest hobbies. He currently lives in Wervershoof, which is also where his videos are produced.

In 2006, Bakker created the first version of the Jelle's Marble Runs YouTube channel. He received the Guinness World Record for the world's longest marble run on May 21, 2009, a record that he held until 2011. Greg Woods, an early fan of the channel, produced a commentary on his own for one of the marble race videos. Bakker liked the video so much that he ended up partnering with Woods, who became the English-language commentator for the entire series. Jelle founded the first marble race event, The Sand Marble Rally, with Greg Woods as commentator.

The channel soon started gaining attention and a fanbase in 2015, Jelle's brother Dion came up with the idea to make more marble races instead of marble runs and founded The MarbleLympics in 2016 as a mock version of the Olympic Games. Originally, Bakker planned to end the MarbleLympics series after the 2017 MarbleLympics. "The MarbleLympics will end in early August with an ending ceremony", he said in an interview by The Irish News, "but I will still continue in making great marbles-related videos." However, he continued the series due to popularity.

In late 2018, Bakker accidentally deleted his original channel of 620,000 subscribers while attempting to delete his Google+ account and was subsequently forced to relaunch. By March 2020 the channel's subscriber number had surpassed this former level.

In 2020 Jelle's brother Dion founded Jelle's Marble Runs as a business, with both Jelle's Marble Runs and Dion Media as owners and creators of the YouTube channel. Dion Media started a webshop, and founded a Patreon page. Dion also founded a new concept of Marble Races, The Marbula One, which is a mock version of the Formula One. The FIA accepted the name Marbula One. The IOC didn't accept the name ‘Marblelympics’, so it was changed into The Marble League.  the On 17 May 2020, British-American comedian and late-night show host John Oliver announced on his show Last Week Tonight with John Oliver that the show would be the head sponsor for the 2020 Marble League.

Known series

Recurring

Marble League
The Marble League (formerly the MarbleLympics until 2019) is an annual series featuring marbles competing in Olympics-inspired events. Sixteen teams compete against each other to win medals across multiple events, including balancing, hurdles, and funnel endurance. Points are awarded to teams based on their final event placements alongside medals for the top three event finishers. The champions of the Marble League are crowned based on the total cumulative points from all events in a single edition. Top-ranked teams, usually those in the top three, automatically qualify for the next Marble League championship and, starting from 2018, a team will be chosen to host the next Marble League edition, granting them an automatic qualification for the championship.  A pre-tournament qualifying event determines which remaining teams will be allowed to compete in the League each year.

The 2020 Marble League faced cancellation due to a lack of funding, but a fully paid sponsorship from Last Week Tonight with John Oliver was announced on 17 May 2020 for all 16 events, with $5,000 going to food bank charities in the event winners' name, and $20,000 going to the International Rescue Committee in the overall winners' name, allowed for the 2020 edition to commence as planned.

Starting from late 2020, JMR occasionally announces special Marble League tournaments during the off-season. Unlike the annual championship tournaments, these tournaments are much shorter, with no more than five events. The first of such a kind of tournament, the Marble League Winter Special, was announced on 13 December 2020. This tournament was contested on five events taken directly from the 2018 Marble League edition.

Marble Rally
The Marble Rally (formerly known as the Sand Marble Rally) is a series of off-road marble races, where individual marbles race against each other down a rough terrain course, usually sand, that has been manually constructed. The courses feature a variety of obstacles that impede competing marbles on their way to the finish line. Marbles used for the Marble Rally are larger than marbles used for the Marble League, with a diameter of 25mm compared to the Marble League's 16mm marbles. Starting from the 2017 edition, top-ranked marbles automatically qualify for the next year's Marble Rally championship.

The fifth edition was initially delayed due to the ongoing COVID-19 pandemic. Additionally, the Marble Rally Showdown was announced to have been cancelled, most likely due to the pandemic. However, the first six races had been filmed and were eventually released weekly from 15 September 2020 to 20 October 2020. The season resumed in 2021, with two races filmed in snow, rather than the usual sand terrain. The races were released weekly from 2 April 2021.

Marbula One
Marbula One is a series of circuit-based marble races, where marbles race multiple laps around a racetrack made of Quercetti Big Marbledrome tracks with custom paper stock add-ons, as well as a conveyor belt that returns all marbles back to the top. As its name suggests, this series is directly inspired by the Formula One motor racing championship. Each race event in this series is referred to as Grand Prix, and includes a qualifying session to determine who will qualify for the main race event, as well as the starting grid.

The first edition of Marbula One premiered in February 2020, shortly before the COVID-19 pandemic. Sixteen teams from the Marble League were invited to compete in the inaugural edition, which consisted of eight events. The qualifying session for this edition was a simple single-round session, with each marble given one flying lap to complete. The points system for this edition was also adopted directly from Formula One, including a bonus point for setting the fastest lap time during the main race event.

Each subsequent edition of Marbula One introduces new features, the most recent being thematic features for each racerack, while also making changes to the existing features, with different qualifying formats and championship points systems for each edition. The third edition introduced a redesigned starting grid and conveyor belt to allow for up to 20 marbles to participate in each race.

Marble ManiaX
Marble ManiaX is a series of extreme sports marble competition, featuring a number of structures built from various materials, including K'Nex. This series was introduced in late 2021, and a total of eight teams participated in this tournament series, including three classic Marble League teams.

One-off

Marbula E
Marbula E was a circuit-based marble racing series directly based on the Formula E racing championship. Created as a spin-off of Marbula One, this series was sponsored by Envision Virgin Racing. It featured marble teams named after real Formula E teams that competed in the 2019–20 Formula E Championship (unlike other series, which feature fictional teams) and racetracks closely based on real-life ePrix. The first episode premiered on 18 April 2020, consisting of a race in a recreation of the Paris Street Circuit, and was narrated by British professional Formula E commentator Jack Nicholls. JMR commentator Greg Woods later joined Nicholls from the second race in a circuit based on the Seoul ePrix.

Mercedes-Benz EQ dominated the first half of the season with three consecutive podium finishes. In the second half, TAG Heuer Porsche snatched first in the standings with two consecutive race wins, and managed to hold their lead in the standings at the final race in a circuit based on the London ePrix. Mercedes-Benz EQ finished second overall, while DS Techeetah finished third overall.

Last Marble Standing
To celebrate the channel's 1,111,111 subscribers milestone, Last Marble Standing was announced on 21 May 2020. This tournament, sponsored by Arla Foods UK's Cravendale, featured six new dairy-themed teams, and included six events. The tournament was won by Graze of Glory, who had dominated the entire tournament by staying in first in the standings for all but one events, winning three gold medals and one silver medal in the process.

Discontinued

Hubelino Tournament
The Hubelino Tournament was a tournament series contested on courses constructed with Hubelino marble tracks and using 20mm marbles. The tournament consisted of multiple events run on Hubelino marble tracks, including funnel endurance, which was eventually added to the Marble League. This series was discontinued after the 2018 edition.

Notes

References

External links
 YouTube Channel

YouTube channels launched in 2013
Impact of the COVID-19 pandemic on sports